Fitzroy Crossing Airport  is located  northwest of Fitzroy Crossing, Western Australia.  

The Airport has basic amenities including an undercover waiting area, water fountain and toilet facility for passengers. The airport has a number of private hangars and helipads for light aircraft and small regional airlines. There is a regular passenger service operated by Skippers Aviation between Halls Creek and Broome that picks passengers up in Fitzroy Crossing. 

Fitzroy Crossing Airport is often the only form of transportation between the township of Fitzroy Crossing and the outside world through the wet season.

Airlines and destinations

See also
 List of airports in Western Australia
 Aviation transport in Australia

References

External links
Airservices Aerodromes & Procedure Charts

Kimberley airports